Lorraine Richard (born July 30, 1959 in Havre-Saint-Pierre, Quebec) is a Quebec politician. She is the current Member of National Assembly of Quebec for the riding of Duplessis in the Côte-Nord region. She represents the Parti Québécois.

Richard was a nursing assistant in a health center in Havre St-Pierre for 25 years in which she was also the secretary for the Minganie Health Center's employee union. She was also a school commissioner for 16 years, the Vice-president of the Côte-Nord School Board's Association for five years.

Richard was elected in Duplessis in the 2003 elections and was the PQ's critic for citizen relations, maritime affairs and social services. She was re-elected in the 2007 and 2008 general elections.

External links
 

1959 births
French Quebecers
Living people
Parti Québécois MNAs
People from Côte-Nord
Women MNAs in Quebec
21st-century Canadian politicians
21st-century Canadian women politicians